Harold George Schrier (October 17, 1916 – June 3, 1971) was a United States Marine Corps lieutenant colonel who served in World War II and the Korean War. In World War II, he was awarded the Navy Cross for leading the patrol that captured the top of Mount Suribachi, where he helped raise the first U.S. flag on Iwo Jima on February 23, 1945. In the Korean War, he was wounded in North Korea during the Battle of Chosin Reservoir while commanding a rifle company.

The first flag flown over the southern end of Iwo Jima was regarded to be too small to be seen by the thousands of Marines fighting on the other side of the mountain where the Japanese airfields and most of their troops were located, so it was replaced the same day with a larger flag. Although there were photographs taken of the first flag flying on Mount Suribachi and some which include Schrier, there was no photograph taken of Marines raising the first flag. The second flag-raising was photographed by Associated Press combat photographer Joe Rosenthal and became famous after copies of his photograph appeared in the newspapers two days later. Schrier also was photographed near the second flag.

In 1949, Schrier appeared as himself in the war movie "Sands of Iwo Jima", where he hands the American flag to actor John Wayne (as Sergeant Stryker).

The Marine Corps War Memorial in Arlington, Virginia, is modeled after the historic photograph of six Marines raising the second flag on Iwo Jima.

Early years
Schrier was born in Corder, Missouri, on October 17, 1916. He attended high school in Lexington, Missouri.

U.S. Marine Corps career
Schrier enlisted in the Marine Corps on November 12, 1936. After recruit training at the Marine Corps Recruit Depot in San Diego, California, he was sent to China as a US Embassy guard in Beijing. He also served in Tientsin and Shanghai. In August 1940, he became a drill instructor at the Marine Corps Recruit Depot San Diego.

World War II
In early 1942, Schrier joined the 2nd Marine Raider Battalion at Camp Elliott, San Diego, being promoted to platoon sergeant in April 1942. In June 1942, he was part of two 2nd Raider Battalion companies that were sent to Midway Island to bolster the garrison there. He participated in the Battle of Guadalcanal and found himself taking part in the 2nd Marine Raider Battalion's epic "Long Patrol" behind enemy lines from November to December 1942. During this action, he distinguished himself by leading part of his cut off company to safety after his company commander erroneously led them into a hostile situation. In early 1943, he was promoted to second lieutenant in the field. Subsequently, he was detached to other duties within the Raider organization, such as observation and reconnaissance on enemy-held islands before larger units made assault landings. He was awarded the Legion of Merit for his work at Vangunu Island during the New Georgia Campaign in June 1943. He also served at Bougainville in support of military actions there. In February 1944, after the Marine Raiders were disbanded, he returned to the United States to become an infantry instructor at Marine Corps Base Camp Pendleton. He was assigned next to be the executive officer of E Company, 2nd Battalion, 28th Marine Regiment, 5th Marine Division. In September, the 5th Division left Camp Pendleton for Hawaii, for further training. In January 1945, the 5th Division left Hawaii for the assault and capture of Iwo Jima.

Iwo Jima

On February 19, 1945, Lt. Schrier and E Company landed with the fifth assault wave on the southeast beach of Iwo Jima closest to Mount Suribachi, which was the 28th Marine Regiment's objective. Because of heavy fighting, the base of Mount Suribachi was not reached and surrounded until February 22.

First flag raising
On February 23, 1945, Lieutenant Colonel Chandler W. Johnson, commander of the 2nd Battalion, 28th Marine Regiment, ordered a platoon-size patrol to climb up 556-foot Mount Suribachi. Captain Dave Severance, E Company's commander, assembled the remainder of his Third Platoon and other members of the battalion headquarters, including two Navy corpsmen and stretcher bearers. First Lieutenant Harold Schrier, E Company's executive officer, volunteered for the mission and was handed the Second Battalion's American flag from Lt. Colonel Johnson (or the battalion adjutant) measuring 28 by 54 inches (137 by 71 cm), which had been taken from the attack transport  on the way to Iwo Jima by First Lieutenant George G. Wells, the Second Battalion's adjutant in charge of the battalion's flags. Lt. Schrier was to take a patrol with the flag up the mountain and raise the flag if possible at the summit to signal that Mount Suribachi was captured. At 8:30 a.m., Lt. Schrier started climbing with the patrol up the mountain. Less than an hour later, the patrol, after receiving occasional Japanese sniper fire, reached the rim of the volcano. After a brief firefight there, Lt. Schrier and his men captured the summit.

A long section of a Japanese steel water pipe was found on the mountain and the battalion's flag was tied on to it by Lt. Schrier, Sgt. Henry Hansen and Cpl. Charles Lindberg (Platoon Sergeant Ernest Thomas was watching inside the group with a grenade in his hand while Pvt. Phil Ward held the bottom of the pipe horizontally off the ground). The flagstaff was then carried to the highest part on the crater and raised by Lt. Schrier, Platoon Sgt. Thomas, Sgt. Hansen, and Cpl. Lindberg at approximately 10:30 a.m. Seeing the national colors flying caused loud cheering with some gunfire from the Marines, sailors, and Coast Guardsmen on the beach below and from the men on the ships near and docked at the beach. Due to the strong wind on Mount Suribachi, Sgt. Hansen, Pvt. Ward, and Third Platoon corpsman John Bradley helped make the flagstaff stay in a vertical position. The men at, around, and holding the flagstaff, which included Schrier's radioman Raymond Jacobs (assigned to patrol from F Company), were photographed several times by Staff Sgt. Louis R. Lowery, a photographer with Leatherneck magazine who accompanied the patrol up the mountain. A firefight with some Japanese soldiers took place, and an enemy grenade caused Sgt. Lowery to fall several feet down the side of the crater, damaging his camera but not his film.

On February 24, Lt. Schrier ordered Platoon Sgt. Thomas to report early the next morning to Marine Lieutenant General Holland Smith aboard Navy Vice Admiral Richmond K. Turner's flagship the  about the flag raising on Mount Suribachi. On February 25, Platoon Sgt. Thomas met with the two officers and during a CBS radio news interview aboard ship, he named Lt. Schrier, Sgt. Henry Hansen, and himself as the actual flag-raisers. Rosenthal's photograph of the second flag raising appeared in the newspapers the same day as Platoon Sgt. Thomas's interview.

Lt. Schrier was awarded the Navy Cross for extraordinary heroism on February 23. Platoon Sgt. Thomas was killed on Iwo Jima on March 3 and Sgt. Hansen was killed on March 1.

Second flag raising

On the same day that his battalion's flag was raised, Lt. Col. Johnson determined that a larger flag should replace it. The flag was too small to be seen on the other side of the mountain where three Japanese airfields and most of the Japanese troops were located, and Johnson thought that the thousands of Marines fighting there needed the inspiration from seeing the flag. A 96 by 56 inch flag was obtained from a ship docked on shore and brought up to the top of Mount Suribachi by Pfc. Rene Gagnon the Second Battalion's runner (messenger) for E Company. At the same time, Sgt. Michael Strank, Cpl. Harlon Block, Pfc. Franklin Sousley, and Pfc. Ira Hayes from Second Platoon, E Company, were sent to take communication wire or supplies up to the Third Platoon and raise the second flag. Once on top, the flag was attached to another Japanese steel pipe. Shortly before 1 p.m., Lt. Schrier ordered the second flag raised and the first flag lowered. The four Marines and Pfc. Harold Schultz and Pfc. Harold Keller (both members Lt. Schrier's patrol) raised the larger flag. The first flagstaff was lowered by three Marines and Pfc. Gagnon, who removed the flag and took it down the mountain to the battalion adjutant.

The Marines who captured Mount Suribachi and those who raised the first flag generally did not receive national recognition even though the first flag raising had received some public recognition first. The black and white photograph of the second flag raising by Joe Rosenthal of the Associated Press became world-famous after appearing in the newspapers as the flag raising on Iwo Jima.  Marine combat photographer Sergeant William Genaust, who had accompanied Rosenthal and Marine photographer Pvt. Robert Campbell up Mount Suribachi, filmed the second flag raising in color and it was used in newsreels. Other combat photographers ascended the mountain after the first flag was raised and the mountaintop secured. These photographers including Rosenthal and an army photographer who was assigned to cover Marine amphibious landings for Yank Magazine, took photos of Marines (including Sgt. Hansen), corpsmen, and themselves around both of the flags. The second flag-raisers received national recognition. After the replacement flag was raised, sixteen Marines, including Schrier and Hansen, and two Navy corpsmen (John Bradley and Gerald Ziehme from the 40-man patrol) posed together for Rosenthal around the base of the flagstaff.

On February 27, Schrier left Mount Suribachi and became the commander of D Company, 2nd Battalion, 28th Marines. He was later awarded the Silver Star Medal for leading a successful counterattack on March 24 against a large number of fanatical Japanese soldiers who attacked the rear position of his lightly manned command post.

On March 14, another American flag was officially raised up a flagpole by two Marines under the orders of Lt. Gen. Holland Smith during a ceremony at the V Amphibious Corps command post on the other side of Mount Suribachi where the 3rd Marine Division troops were located. The flag flying on the summit of Mount Suribachi since February 23 was taken down. On March 26, 1945, the island was considered secure and the battle of Iwo Jima was officially ended. Lt. Schrier and the 28th Marines left Iwo Jima on March 27 and returned to Hawaii to the 5th Marine Division training camp. Lt. Col. Johnson was killed in action on March 2, Sgt. Genaust was killed on March 4, Sgt. Strank and Cpl. Block were killed on March 1, and Pfc. Sousley was killed on March 21.

Lt. Schrier served in San Diego from July to October 1945. Afterwards, he served in Seal Beach, California, Samar, Philippines, and in Yokosuka, Japan. In 1949, Captain Schrier returned to the United States and was assigned as a technical advisor (he also appeared as himself with flag raiser Ira Hayes and former corpsman John Bradley) in the motion picture Sands of Iwo Jima, starring John Wayne.

Korean War
The Korean War broke out on June 25, 1950, and Captain Schrier was sent to Korea with the 1st Provisional Marine Brigade in July. He was awarded the Bronze Star Medal for his actions while serving as the brigade adjutant in August and September during the Battle of Pusan Perimeter in South Korea. He was assigned next as the company commander of I Company, 3rd Battalion, 5th Marines, 1st Marine Division. During the Battle of Chosin Reservoir in North Korea, he was wounded in the neck on December 1, during an all-night hill fight at Hill 1520 with Chinese Communist troops. He was evacuated to Japan.

Marine Corps War Memorial 

The Marine Corps War Memorial (also known as the Iwo Jima Memorial) in Arlington, Virginia, which was inspired by Joe Rosenthal's photograph of the second flag-raising on Mount Suribachi by six Marines on February 23, 1945, was dedicated on November 10, 1954 (179th anniversary of the Marine Corps). Schrier, Charles Lindberg, and Lou Lowery, from the patrol that raised the first flag on Mount Suribachi, attended the dedication ceremony as guests.

President Dwight D. Eisenhower sat upfront during the dedication ceremony with Vice President Richard Nixon, Secretary of Defense Charles E. Wilson, Deputy Secretary of Defense Robert Anderson, Assistant Secretary of the Interior Orme Lewis, and General Lemuel C. Shepherd, the 20th Commandant of the Marine Corps. Ira Hayes, one of the three surviving flag raisers depicted on the monument, was also seated upfront with John Bradley (incorrectly identified as a flag raiser until 2016), Rene Gagnon (incorrectly identified as a flag raiser until October 16, 2019), Mrs Martha Strank, Mrs. Ada Belle Block, and Mrs. Goldie Price (mother of Franklin Sousley). Those giving remarks at the dedication included Robert Anderson, Chairman of Day; Colonel J.W. Moreau, U.S. Marine Corps (Retired), President, Marine Corps War Memorial Foundation; General Shepherd, who presented the memorial to the American people; Felix de Weldon, sculptor; and Richard Nixon, who gave the dedication address. Inscribed on the memorial are the following words:

In Honor And Memory Of The Men of The United States Marine Corps Who Have Given Their Lives To Their Country Since 10 November 1775

Retirement and death 
Schrier was promoted to major in May 1951, and was the officer in charge of the Marine Corps recruiting station in Birmingham, Alabama. Afterwards, he was the  provost marshal at the Marine Corps Recruit Depot, San Diego, California. He retired from the Marine Corps as a lieutenant colonel in 1957.

Schrier died at a hospital in Bradenton, Florida, in 1971. He is buried in Mansion Memorial Park in Ellenton, Florida.

Military awards
Schrier's military decorations and awards include:

Navy Cross citation

Silver Star Citation

Silver Star Medal

The President of the United States of America takes pleasure in presenting the Silver Star Medal to First Lieutenant Harold George Schrier, United States Marine Corps, for conspicuous gallantry and intrepidity as Commanding Officer of Company D, Second Battalion, Twenty-eighth Marines, Fifth Marine Division, in action against enemy Japanese forces on Iwo Jima, Volcano Islands, on 24 March 1945. Realizing the seriousness of the situation when a group of approximately one hundred Japanese infiltrated through the main defensive positions shortly after midnight and launched a fanatical attack against the rear of his lightly-manned command post, First Lieutenant Schrier boldly rallied his men and opposed the onrushing enemy, setting a courageous example. His leadership and fighting spirit throughout this action were in keeping with the highest traditions of the United States Naval Service. For the President, John L. Sullivan, Secretary of the Navy

Legion of Merit

Awarded for actions during the World War II

The President of the United States of America takes pleasure in presenting the Legion of Merit to Second Lieutenant Harold George Schrier (MCSN: 0-19234), United States Marine Corps, for exceptionally meritorious conduct in the performance of outstanding services to the Government of the United States as a member of a reconnaissance party attached to the First Marine Raider Regiment operating in the Solomon Islands Area from 13 to 30 June 1943. Preceding the landing of our invasion forces, Second Lieutenant Schrier with his party made his way by canoe to the enemy-held Vangunu Island and for two days, in the face of extreme danger, stayed close to the hostile lines in order to observe troop concentrations, bivouac areas, possible gun positions and trails. When the other members of his party left, he dauntlessly remained in the Japanese-infested area and nine days later flashed signals to the approaching ships and guided troops to the beach. By his fearless devotion to duty in supplying accurate and vital information to the commanding officers, Second Lieutenant Schrier contributed materially to the capture of the area and upheld the highest traditions of the United States Naval Service.
General Orders: Heroes U.S. Marine Corps, 1861 – 1955: Jane Blakeney
Action Date: June 13 – 30, 1943
Service: Marine Corps
Rank: Second Lieutenant
Regiment: 1st Marine Raider Regiment

http://valor.militarytimes.com/recipient.php?recipientid=8139

Portrayal in films
 Sands of Iwo Jima, 1949 (Capt. Harold G. Schrier, USMC as Lieutenant Harold Schrier, USMC).
 Flags of Our Fathers, 2006 (Lieutenant Schrier, USMC, was played by actor Jason Gray-Stanford).

See also

Raising the Flag on Iwo Jima
Battle of Iwo Jima
Marine Corps War Memorial

Notes

References

1916 births
1971 deaths
United States Marine Corps officers
Battle of Iwo Jima
United States Marine Corps personnel of World War II
United States Marine Corps personnel of the Korean War
Marine Raiders
Recipients of the Navy Cross (United States)
Recipients of the Silver Star
Recipients of the Legion of Merit
People from Lafayette County, Missouri
People from Bradenton, Florida
Military personnel from Missouri